Qorovulbozor District is a district of Bukhara Region in Uzbekistan. The capital lies at the city Qorovulbozor.

The district consists of 1 city (Qorovulbozor) and 4 rural communities (Navbahor, Bo'ston, Buzachi, Jarqoq).

References

Bukhara Region
Districts of Uzbekistan